Brusqeulia caracagena is a species of moth of the family Tortricidae. It is found in Minas Gerais, Brazil.

The wingspan is about 15 mm. The ground colour of the forewings is white, in the terminal third of the wing indistinctly mixed with pinkish. The markings are black. The hindwings are brownish grey.

Etymology
The specific name refers to the place of origin, Caraca plus the Greek word genos (meaning  descendent).

References

Moths described in 2011
Brusqeulia
Moths of South America
Taxa named by Józef Razowski